Anseriformes is an order of birds   also known as waterfowl that comprises about 180 living species of birds in three families: Anhimidae (three species of screamers), Anseranatidae (the magpie goose), and Anatidae, the largest family, which includes over 170 species of waterfowl, among them the ducks, geese, and swans. Most modern species in the order are highly adapted for an aquatic existence at the water surface. With the exception of screamers, males have penises, a trait that has been lost in the Neoaves. Due to their aquatic nature, most species are web-footed.

Evolution
Anseriformes are one of only two types of modern bird to be confirmed present during the Mesozoic alongside the other dinosaurs, and in fact were among the very few birds to survive their extinction, along with their cousins the galliformes. These two groups only occupied two ecological niches during the Mesozoic, living in water and on the ground, while the toothed enantiornithes were the dominant birds that ruled the trees and air. The asteroid that ended the Mesozoic destroyed all trees as well as animals in the open, a condition that took centuries to recover from. The anseriformes and galliformes are thought to have survived in the cover of burrows and water, and not to have needed trees for food and reproduction.

The earliest Cretaceous anseriform found so far is Vegavis, a goose-like waterfowl thought to have lived as long as 66 million years ago. Some members apparently surviving the KT extinction event, including presbyornithids, thought to be the common ancestors of ducks, geese, swans, and screamers, the last group once thought to be galliformes, but now genetically confirmed to be closely related to geese. The first known duck fossils start to appear about 34 million years ago.

Waterfowl are the best-known examples of sexually antagonistic genital coevolution in vertebrates, causing genital adaptations to coevolve in each sex to advance control over mating and fertilization. Sexually antagonistic coevolution (or SAC) occurs as a consequence of sexual conflict between males and females, resulting in coevolutionary process that reduce fit, or that functions to decrease ease of having sex.

Taxonomy
The Anseriformes and the Galliformes (pheasants, etc.) belong to a common group, the Galloanserae. They are the most primitive neognathous birds, and as such they should follow the palaeognathae (ratites and tinamous) in bird classification systems. Several unusual extinct families of birds like the albatross-like pseudotooth birds and the giant flightless gastornithids and mihirungs have been found to be stem-anseriforms based on common features found in the skull region, beak physiology and pelvic region. The genus Vegavis for a while was found to be the earliest member of the anseriform crown group but a recent 2017 paper has found it to be just outside the crown group in the family Vegaviidae.

Below is the general consensus of the phylogeny of anseriforms and their stem relatives.

Systematics
Anatidae systematics, especially regarding placement of some "odd" genera in the dabbling ducks or shelducks, is not fully resolved. See the Anatidae article for more information, and for alternate taxonomic approaches. Anatidae is traditionally divided into subfamilies Anatinae and Anserinae. The Anatinae consists of tribes Anatini, Aythyini, Mergini and Tadornini. The higher-order classification below follows a phylogenetic analysis performed by Mikko's Phylogeny Archive and John Boyd's website.

 Order Anseriformes
 ?†Conflicto Claudia P. Tambussi et al. 2019
 †Naranbulagornis Zelenkov 2019
 †Anachronornis
 Suborder Anhimae Wetmore & Miller 1926
 Genus †Chaunoides de Alvarenga 1999
 Family Anhimidae Stejneger 1885 (screamers)
 Genus Anhima (Linnaeus 1766) Brisson 1760 (horned screamer)
 Genus Chauna Illiger 1811
 Suborder Anseres (true Anseriformes)
 Superfamily Anseranatoidea
 Family Anseranatidae Sclater 1880
 Genus †Anserpica Mourer-Chauviré, Berthet & Hugueney 2004
 Genus †Eoanseranas Worthy & Scanlon 2009 (hand's dawn magpie goose)
 Genus †Anatalavis Olson & Parris 1987 (Late Cretaceous/Early Paleocene – Early Eocene)
 Genus Anseranas (Latham 1798) Lesson 1828 (magpie goose)
 Superfamily Anatoidea
 Family †Presbyornithidae Wetmore 1926 (wading-"geese")
 Genus †Teviornis Kuročkin, Dyke & Karhu 2002
 Genus †Telmabates Howard 1955
 Genus †Headonornis (Lydekker 1891) Harrison & Walker 1976
 Genus †Presbyornis Wetmore 1926
 Genus †Wilaru Boles et al. 2013
 Family †Paranyrocidae Miller & Compton 1939
 Genus †Paranyroca Miller & Compton 1939 (Rosebud Early Miocene of Bennett County, USA) 
 Family Anatidae Leach 1820 (almost 150 species)
 Subfamily †Romainvilliinae Lambrecht 1933
 Genus †Romainvillia Lebedinský 1927 (Late Eocene/Early Oligocene)
 Genus †Saintandrea Mayr & De Pietri 2013
 Subfamily Dendrocygninae Reichenbach 1849–50 
 Genus Dendrocygna Swainson 1837 (whistling ducks)
 Genus Thalassornis Eyton 1838 (white-backed duck)
 Subfamily †Dendrocheninae Livezey & Martin 1988
 Genus †Dendrochen Miller 1944
 Genus †Manuherikia Worthy et al. 2007
 Genus †Mionetta Livezey & Martin 1988
 Subfamily Stictonettinae 
 Genus Stictonetta (Gould 1841) Reichenbach 1853 (freckled duck)
 Subfamily Anserinae Vigors 1825 sensu Livezey 1996 (swans and geese)
 Genus †Anserobranta Kuročkin & Ganya 1972
 Genus †Asiavis Nesov 1986
 Genus †“Chenopis” De Vis 1905
 Genus †Cygnavus Lambrecht 1931
 Genus †Cygnopterus Lambrecht 1931
 Genus †Eremochen Brodkorb 1961
 Genus †Megalodytes Howard 1992
 Genus †Paracygnus Short 1969
 Genus †Presbychen Wetmore 1930
 Genus †Cnemiornis Owen 1866 (New Zealand geese)
 Genus †Afrocygnus Louchart et al. 2005
 Genus Coscoroba (Molina 1782) Reichenbach 1853 (Coscoroba swan)
 Genus Cereopsis Latham 1801 (Cape Barren goose)
 Genus Cygnus Garsault 1764
 Genus Branta Scopoli 1769
 Tribe Anserini Vigors 1825
 Genus Anser Brisson 1760
 Subfamily Tadorninae Reichenbach 1849–50 (shelducks and sheldgeese)
 Genus †Australotadorna Worthy 2009
 Genus †Brantadorna Howard 1964
 Genus †Centrornis Andrews 1897 (Malagasy sheldgoose)
 Genus †Miotadorna Worthy et al. 2007 (St. Bathans shelduck)
 Genus †Nannonetta Campbell 1979
 Genus †Pleistoanser Agnolín 2006
 Genus Plectropterus (Linnaeus 1766)  (spur-winged goose)
 Genus Merganetta Gould 1842 (Torrent duck)
 Genus Chloephaga Eyton 1838
 Genus Neochen Oberholser 1918
 Genus Cyanochen (Rüppell 1845) Bonaparte 1856 (blue-winged goose)
 Genus Tadorna Boie 1822
 Genus Radjah Reichenbach, 1853
 Genus Alopochen Stejneger 1885
 Genus Cairina (Linnaeus 1758) Fleming 1822 (Muscovy duck)
 Genus Hymenolaimus (Gmelin 1789) Gray 1843 (blue duck)
 Genus Sarkidiornis Eyton 1838
 Genus Tachyeres Owen 1875 (steamer ducks)
 Subfamily Anatinae Vigors 1825 sensu Livezey 1996
 Genus †Dunstanetta Worthy et al. 2007 (Johnstone's duck)
 Genus †Lavadytis Stidham & Hilton 2015
 Genus †Pinpanetta Worthy 2009
 Genus †Tirarinetta Worthy 2008
 Genus Aix Boie 1828
 Genus Callonetta Delacour 1936 (ringed teal)
 Genus Chenonetta von Brandt 1836 (Australian wood duck)
 Genus Biziura Stephens 1824 (musk ducks)
 Genus Pteronetta (Cassin 1860) Salvadori 1895 (Hartlaub's duck)
 Genus Marmaronetta (Ménétries 1832) Reichenbach 1853 (marbled duck)
 Genus Asarcornis (Müller 1842) Salvadori 1895 (white-winged duck)
 Genus Netta Kaup 1829
 Genus Lophonetta (King 1828) Riley 1914 (crested duck)
 Genus Amazonetta (Gmelin 1789) von Boetticher 1929 (Brazilian teal)
 Tribe Oxyurini Swainson 1831 (stiff-tailed ducks and allies)
 Genus †Anabernicula Ross 1935
 Genus Heteronetta (Merrem 1841) Salvadori 1865 (black-headed duck)
 Genus Nomonyx (Linnaeus 1766) Ridgway 1880 (masked duck)
 Genus Oxyura Bonaparte 1828
 Genus Nettapus von Brandt 1836 (pygmy geese)
 Genus Malacorhynchus Swainson 1831 (pink-eared duck)
 Genus Salvadorina Rothschild & Hartert 1894 (Salvadori's teal)
 Genus Speculanas (King 1828) von Boetticher 1929 (bronze-winged duck)
 Tribe Mergini  Rafinesque 1815 (eiders, scoters, mergansers and other sea-ducks)
 Genus †Chendytes Miller 1925
 Genus †Shiriyanetta Watanabe & Matsuoka 2015
 Genus †Camptorhynchus (Gmelin 1789) Bonaparte 1838 (Labrador duck)
 Genus Histrionicus Lesson 1828 (harlequin duck)
 Genus Clangula Leach 1819 (long-tailed duck)
 Genus Polysticta stelleri (Pallas 1769) Eyton 1836 (Steller's eider)
 Genus Somateria Leach 1819 (eiders)
 Genus Melanitta Boie 1822 (scoters)
 Genus Bucephala Baird 1858
 Genus Mergellus Selby 1840 (Smew)
 Genus Lophodytes (Linnaeus 1758) Reichenbach 1853 (hooded merganser)
 Genus Mergus Linnaeus 1758 non Brisson 1760
 Tribe Anatini Vigors 1825 sensu Livezey 1996 (dabbling ducks and moa-nalos)
 Genus †Matanas Worthy et al. 2007 (Enright's duck)
 Genus Anas Linnaeus 1758
 Genus Sibirionetta (Georgi 1775) (Baikal teal)
 Genus  Mareca (Stephens 1824)
 Genus Spatula Boie 1822
 Tribe Aythyini  Delacour and Mayr, 1945 (diving ducks)
 Genus Aythya Boie 1822

Some fossil anseriform taxa not assignable with certainty to a family are:
 †Proherodius (London Clay Early Eocene of London, England) – Presbyornithidae?
 †Garganornis ballmanni Meijer 2014

Unassigned Anatidae:
 †"Anas" albae Jánossy 1979 [?Mergus]
 †"Anas" amotape Campbell 1979
 †"Anas" isarensis Lambrecht 1933
 †"Anas" luederitzensis
 †"Anas" sanctaehelenae Campbell 1979
 †"Anas" eppelsheimensis Lambrecht 1933
 †"Oxyura" doksana Mlíkovský 2002
 †"Anser" scaldii ["Anas" scaldii]
 †Ankonetta larriestrai Cenizo & Agnolín 2010
 †Cayaoa bruneti Tonni 1979
 †Eoneornis nomen dubium
 †Eutelornis
 †Aldabranas cabri Harrison & Walker 1978
 †Chenoanas deserta Zelenkov 2012
 †Cygnopterus alphonsi Cheneval 1984 [non Cygnavus senckenbergi Mlíkovský 2002]
 †Helonetta brodkorbi Emslie 1992
 †Loxornis clivus Ameghino 1894
 †Mioquerquedula minutissima Zelenkov & Kuročkin 2012 [Anas velox Milne-Edwards 1867]
 †Paracygnopterus scotti Harrison & Walker 1979
 †Proanser major Umanskaya 1979
 †Teleornis Ameghino 1899
 †Protomelanitta Zelenkov 2011
 †Nogusunna conflictoides Zelenkov 2011
 †Sharganetta mongolica Zelenkov 2011
 Metopiana Bonaparte 1856 [Metopias Heine & Reichenow 1890; Phoeonetta Delacour 1937; Netta (Phoeoaythia) Delacour 1937]
 †Bambolinetta (Portis 1884) Mayr & Pavia 2014 [Anas lignitifila Portis 1884]
 †Heteroanser vicinus (Kuročkin 1976) Zelenkov 2012 [Heterochen vicinus Kuročkin 1976; Anser vicinus (Kuročkin 1976) Mlíkovský & Švec 1986]
 †Sinanas Yeh 1980
 †Talpanas Olson & James 2009 (Kaua'i mole duck)
 †Wasonaka Howard 1966
 †Chelychelynechen Olson & James 1991 (turtle-jawed moa-nalo)
 †Ptaiochen Olson & James 1991 (small-billed moa-nalo)
 †Thambetochen Olson & Wetmore 1976

In addition, a considerable number of mainly Late Cretaceous and Paleogene fossils have been described where it is uncertain whether or not they are anseriforms. This is because almost all orders of aquatic birds living today either originated or underwent a major radiation during that time, making it hard to decide whether some waterbird-like bone belongs into this family or is the product of parallel evolution in a different lineage due to adaptive pressures.

 "Presbyornithidae" gen. et sp. indet. (Barun Goyot Late Cretaceous of Udan Sayr, Mongolia) – Presbyornithidae?
 UCMP 117599 (Hell Creek Late Cretaceous of Bug Creek West, USA)
 Petropluvialis (Late Eocene of England) – may be same as Palaeopapia
 Agnopterus (Late Eocene – Late Oligocene of Europe) – includes Cygnopterus lambrechti
 "Headonornis hantoniensis" BMNH PAL 4989 (Hampstead Early Oligocene of Isle of Wight, England) – formerly "Ptenornis"
 Palaeopapia (Hampstead Early Oligocene of Isle of Wight, England)
 "Anas" creccoides (Early/Middle Oligocene of Belgium)
 "Anas" skalicensis (Early Miocene of "Skalitz", Czech Republic)
 "Anas" risgoviensis (Late Miocene of Bavaria, Germany)
 †"Anas" meyerii Milne-Edwards 1867 [Aythya meyerii (Milne-Edwards 1867) Brodkorb 1964]
 †Eonessa anaticula Wetmore 1938 {Eonessinae Wetmore 1938}

Phylogeny
Living Anseriformes based on the work by John Boyd.

Molecular studies

Studies of the mitochondrial DNA suggest the existence of four branches – Anseranatidae, Dendrocygninae, Anserinae and Anatinae – with Dendrocygninae being a subfamily within the family Anatidae and Anseranatidae representing an
independent family. The clade Somaterini has a single genus Somateria.

See also
List of Anseriformes by population
List of Anseriformes

References

Cited texts

 
 
 
 Murray, P. F. & Vickers-Rich, P. (2004) Magnificent Mihirungs: The Colossal Flightless Birds of the Australian Dreamtime. Indiana University Press.

 
Bird orders
Extant Maastrichtian first appearances
Late Cretaceous taxonomic orders
Paleocene taxonomic orders
Eocene taxonomic orders
Oligocene taxonomic orders
Miocene taxonomic orders
Pliocene taxonomic orders
Pleistocene taxonomic orders
Holocene taxonomic orders
Taxa named by Johann Georg Wagler